Stocking Branch is a stream in the U.S. state of Georgia. It is a tributary of Bushy Creek.

A variant name is Stocking Creek. The creek's name is derived a corruption of "Stalking Creek", so named for the local Native American custom of wearing camouflaged masks when deer hunting.

References

Rivers of Georgia (U.S. state)
Rivers of Burke County, Georgia